Beybaghli (also Romanized as Beybağlı) is a village in Gowg Tappeh Rural District, in the Central District of Bileh Savar County, Ardabil Province, Iran. The village is located between two cities of Germi and Bilasuvar north of Ardabil, on the Iranian Azerbaijan and the Republic of Azerbaijan border. Beybagli is home to Beybagli tribe, one of the 32 tribes of the Turkish Shahseven tribal confederacy of Mughan. The people of this village are engaged in traditional farming and herding practices. Wheat, barley, lentils, and peas are grown. The village's dairy products are milk, cheese, butter, cream and yoghurt. At the 2006 census, its population was 19, in 7 families.

References 

Towns and villages in Bileh Savar County